In Russia, Finland, Poland, and a few nearby countries, a sokha is a light wooden ard, consisting of two body ards, with their parallel beams forming the two shafts for a single horse-drawn tillage implement with two socket shares (рассоха). In later types the double body is combined into one wooden board. Chronicles and other literary sources show that the sokha was in use in Russia at least since the 13th century. It originated from northern Russia, e.g., around Novgorod.

The sokha adapts the body ard to a single-animal harness following the pattern of a shaft-drawn cart and adds a spade-like component that turned over the soil. (On ploughs the curved mouldboard both cuts and turns the soil.) Other design features can vary depending on local building custom.

References

Bibliography
 George Vernadsky. A History of Russia. (Yale University Press, 1969).

See also

 Timeline of Russian inventions and technology records

Agricultural machinery
Animal equipment
Gardening tools
Science and technology in Russia
Russian inventions
Ploughs

nn:Ard